Sidney Walter Smith JP (20 January 1893 – 26 August 1981) was a New Zealand politician of the National Party. He was a Parliamentary Under-Secretary and later a Minister.

Biography

Smith was born in Ashburton in 1893. He received his education at Algin Primary and Ashburton High Schools. He served in the NZEF in France and Egypt in World War I. He then farmed at Opuawhanga and Pakaraka and went into business. He was on several local boards, acting as a member of the Bay of Islands County Council and the Bay of Islands Hospital Board, and as Chairman of the Bay of Islands Dairy Company.

He married Dorothy Alice Blundell in 1924.

He represented the Bay of Islands electorate from 1943 to 1946, and the renamed Hobson electorate from 1946 to 1960 when he retired. Under Sidney Holland, he was Parliamentary Under-Secretary for the Minister of Agriculture and of Marketing (1949–1954). In the second Holland Ministry, he was Minister of Internal Affairs and Minister of Forests (1954–1957). Under Keith Holyoake in 1957, he continued with the Internal Affairs and Forestry portfolios, and was also appointed Minister of Agriculture.

After his retirement from Parliament in 1960, he was deputy chairman of the Auckland Division of the National Party from 1963 to 1965. He also served on the board of the ASB Bank and was President when he retired in 1975.

He died in Auckland in 1981 aged 88, 23 days before the death of his wife.

Notes

References

1893 births
1981 deaths
New Zealand National Party MPs
New Zealand military personnel of World War I
Members of the New Zealand House of Representatives
New Zealand MPs for North Island electorates
Members of the Cabinet of New Zealand
20th-century New Zealand politicians